Cardiapoda is a genus of very small floating sea snails or heteropods,  pelagic gastropod molluscs or micromolluscs in the family Carinariidae.

Both tentacles are of equal size and well-developed. The external layer of the body wall is thin.

They are found worldwide in the pelagic zone of warm seas.

Species
 Cardiapoda placenta (Lesson, 1831) - flat cardiapod
 Cardiapoda richardi Vayssière, 1903

Synonyms 
 Cardiapoda acuta Tesch, 1906 (synonym of Cardiapoda placenta (Lesson, 1831) )
 Cardiapoda carinata D'Orbigny, 1834 (synonym of Cardiapoda richardi Vayssière, 1903)
 Cardiapoda pedunculata D'Orbigny, 1835 (synonym of Cardiapoda placenta (Lesson, 1831) )
 Cardiapoda sublaevis Tesch, 1906 (synonym of Cardiapoda placenta (Lesson, 1831) )

References
 Seapy, Roger R. 2008. Cardiapoda d'Orbigny 1836. Version 12 February 2008, Tree of Life Web Project : Cardiapoda
 
 Powell A. W. B., New Zealand Mollusca, William Collins Publishers Ltd, Auckland, New Zealand 1979 

Carinariidae